The Ottawa Athletics (also known as the Ottawa A's) were a professional minor-league baseball team based in Ottawa, Ontario, Canada, that operated from 1952 to 1954. The team played at Lansdowne Park in Ottawa and was a member of the Triple-A International League.

History
Ottawa had most recently hosted the Nationals and the Senators of the Class C Border League from 1947 to 1950, leading that league in attendance for three of its four seasons and making the playoffs each year.

In 1951, the New York Giants of the National League operated two Triple-A affiliates, the Ottawa Giants and the Minneapolis Millers of the American Association. But after the 1951 campaign, the parent Giants decided to field only one top-level minor-league team in —the Millers—and they abandoned Ottawa.  The Philadelphia Athletics of the American League, who had no Triple-A affiliate in 1951, replaced the Giants and the Ottawa team was renamed.

The  season saw Ottawa's attendance (over 153,000 fans) increase by 31 percent over the 1951 Giants', but the A's finished in seventh place in the eight-team IL. The Athletics' record over their three years in Ottawa was a poor 194–264 (.424).

The Ottawa A's then relocated in 1955 to Columbus, Ohio, which had just lost its longtime American Association franchise to Omaha.  The Ottawa Athletics were renamed the Columbus Jets, and the Jets and the International League remained in Ohio's capital city until , when a deteriorating home stadium led the Jets to move to Charleston, West Virginia, as the Charleston Charlies.

Notable players

Charlie Bishop
Moe Burtschy
Bob Cain
Joe Coleman
Art Ditmar
Luke Easter
Hank Foiles
Marion Fricano
Lou Limmer
Jack Littrell
Héctor López
Jean-Pierre Roy
Bob Trice
Coaker Triplett
Taft Wright

See also
 Ottawa Giants
 Tommy Gorman
 Ottawa Lynx

References

Baseball teams established in 1952
Baseball teams disestablished in 1954
Defunct International League teams
Ath
Philadelphia Athletics minor league affiliates
Defunct baseball teams in Canada
1952 establishments in Ontario
1954 disestablishments in Ontario